FK Polet 1926 (Serbian Cyrillic: ФК Пoлeт 1926) is a Bosnian-Herzegovinian football club based in Brod, Republika Srpska.

The club colours are red and white.

External links
 Profile, results and tables club www.srbijasport.net 

Football clubs in Republika Srpska
Football clubs in Bosnia and Herzegovina